is a Japanese model represented by LesPros Entertainment.

Biography
Ui was born in Tako, Katori District, Chiba Prefecture.

She was a member Nippon TV's Zoom in!! Super from 2009 to 2010 and a weather caster from 2010 to 2011.

Ui was a finalist in the LesPros Girl Audition 2008 from LesPros Entertainment. She was later recognized by her agency and debuted as a model.

In 2009 Ui was an exclusive model for the magazine JJ. She was later a model for Ray and Spring.

Ui was in charge of the sports corner on Mondays in WOWOW Prime Stream's Purasuto.

Aside from modeling, she appeared in advertisements and as a reporter in television programs.

On her 27th birthday on December 21, 2013, Ui announced that she married professional footballer Junya Tanaka. She later announced on her blog that she gave birth on July 16, 2014.

Filmography

TV series

Advertisements

Magazines
Current

Former

Music videos

References

External links
 
 

Japanese female models
1986 births
Living people
People from Chiba Prefecture
21st-century Japanese women